Central Sheep Breeding Farm, Hisar is a public funded agricultural research, breeding and education institute located at Hisar in the Indian state of Haryana that offers educational courses in Shearing Training and Sheep Management & Production Training.

History 
It was established in 1968 as a collaboration between Government of Australia and India Ministry of Agriculture & Farmers Welfare.

CSBF

Details
In 2015, it had sheep strength 4217 and goat strength of 481.

Facilities 
In institute has facilities for imparting training, hostels for the farmer students, research and breeding farms, laboratories, etc. It has teaching and technical staff of 213 and 9 administrative staff.

See also 
 List of institutions of higher education in Haryana
 List of universities and colleges in Hisar
 List of agricultural universities and colleges

References

External links 
 

Research institutes in Hisar (city)
Agricultural universities and colleges in India
Universities and colleges in Haryana
Universities and colleges in Hisar (city)
Animal husbandry in Haryana
Animal husbandry in India
Breeder organizations
1968 establishments in Haryana